The Lucie Awards is an annual event honoring achievements in photography, founded in 2003 by Hossein Farmani.

The Lucie Awards is an annual gala ceremony presented by the Lucie Foundation (a 501 (c)3 non-profit charitable organization), honoring photographers and their achievements. The Lucies bring together photographers from all over the world and pay tribute to their colleagues. Every year, the Advisory Board nominates individuals for their contributions to photography across a variety of categories, and once the nominations are tallied, they are pre-announced months before the Lucies.

In addition to honoring photographers, the Lucie Awards also showcase the finalists and winners of the International Photography Awards (Lucie Foundation's sister-effort) annual photography competition, presenting over $22,500 in cash prizes and four distinct titles: The International Photographer of the Year (given to a professional), The Discovery of the Year (awarded to a non-professional), The Deeper Perspective Photographer of the Year (awarded to either a professional or non-professional) and the Moving Image Photographer of the Year (awarded to either a professional or non-professional).

The Lucie Awards also present statues to photographers in six different categories, entitled the Support Category Awards. Those categories acknowledge those integral to crafting an image. They are Book Publisher of the Year, Print Advertising Campaign of the Year, Fashion Layout of the Year, Picture Editor of the Year, Curator/Exhibition of the Year and Photography Magazine of the Year.

In the week leading up to the Lucie Awards, there are exhibitions and artist talks in New York City, including the annual International Photography Awards “Best of Show”, which shows 45 winning images from each calendar year's competition, selected by a different curator each year.

History
In its 2003 inaugural year, the ceremony was held in Los Angeles, and then moved to New York City, where it has been held at the American Airlines Theatre, Lincoln Center and Carnegie Hall.

Recipients

2003
Henri Cartier-Bresson – 2003 Lifetime Achievement
Robert Evans – 2003 Visionary Award
Phil Borges – 2003 Humanitarian Award
Ruth Bernhard – 2003 Achievement in Fine Art
William Claxton – 2003 Achievement in Music
Mary Ellen Mark – 2003 Achievement in Documentary.
Steve McCurry – 2003 Achievement in Photojournalism
Douglas Kirkland – 2003 Achievement in Entertainment
Melvin Sokolsky – 2003 Achievement in Fashion
Tim Street-Porter – 2003 Achievement in Architecture
Phil Stern – 2003 Achievement in Still for Motion Pictures
Annie Leibovitz – 2003 Women in Photography Award (presented by Women in Photography International)
Gene Trindl – 2003 Achievement in Portraiture
RJ Muna – 2003 Achievement in Advertising

2004
Gordon Parks – 2004 Lifetime Achievement
Sebastiao Salgado – 2004 Humanitarian Award
Cornell Capa – 2004 Visionary Award
Arthur Leipzig – 2004 Achievement in Fine Art
James Nachtwey – 2004 Achievement in Photojournalism
Sylvia Plachy – 2004 Women in Photography Award (presented by Women In Photography International)
Julius Shulman – 2004 Achievement in Architecture
Jim Marshall – 2004 Achievement in Music
Bruce Davidson – 2004 Achievement in Documentary
Bert Stern – 2004 Achievement in Entertainment
Lillian Bassman – 2004 Achievement in Fashion
Arnold Newman – 2004 Achievement in Portraiture
Jay Maisel – 2004 Achievement in Advertising
Walter Iooss – 2004 Achievement in Sports
Bob Willoughby – 2004 Achievement in Still for Motion Pictures

2005
William Klein – 2005 Lifetime Achievement
Harry Benson – 2005 Achievement in Portraiture
Larry Clark – 2005 Achievement in Documentary
Lucien Clergue – 2005 Achievement in Fine Art
Hiro – 2005 Achievement in Advertising
Antonín Kratochvíl – 2005 Achievement in Photojournalism
Peter Lindbergh – 2005 Achievement in Fashion
Ozzie Sweet – 2005 Achievement in Sports
Zana Briski – 2005 Humanitarian Award

2006
David Bailey – 2006 Achievement in Fashion
Eikoh Hosoe – 2006 Visionary Award
Neil Leifer – 2006 Achievement in Sports
Roger Mayne – 2006 Achievement in Documentary
Duane Michals – 2006 Achievement in Portraiture
Sarah Moon – 2006 Achievement in Fine Art
Marc Riboud – 2006 Achievement in Photojournalism
Willy Ronis – 2006 Lifetime Achievement
Albert Watson – 2006 Achievement in Advertising

2007
Elliott Erwitt – 2007 Lifetime Achievement
Ralph Gibson – 2007 Achievement in Fine Art
Philip Jones Griffiths – 2007 Achievement in Photojournalism
Kenro Izu – 2007 Visionary Award
Heinz Kluetmeier – 2007 Achievement in Sports
Eugene Richards – 2007 Achievement in Documentary
Lord Snowdon – 2007 Achievement in Portraiture
Deborah Turbeville – 2007 Achievement in Fashion
Howard Zieff – 2007 Achievement in Advertising
Magnum Photos (established 1957) – 2007 Spotlight Award

2008
Gianni Berengo Gardin – 2008 Lifetime Achievement
Richard Misrach – 2008 Achievement in Fine Art
Susan Meiselas – 2008 Achievement in Photojournalism
Sara Terry and The Aftermath Project – 2008 Humanitarian Award
John Iacono – 2008 Achievement in Sports
Josef Koudelka – 2008 Achievement in Documentary
Herman Leonard – 2008 Achievement in Portraiture
Patrick Demarchelier – 2008 Achievement in Fashion
Erwin Olaf – 2008 Achievement in Advertising
Visa pour l'image (established 1988) – 2008 Spotlight Award

2009
Gilles Peress – 2009 Achievement in Photojournalism
Marvin Newman – 2009 Achievement in Sports
Ara Guler – 2009 Lifetime Achievement
Jean-Paul Goude – 2009 Achievement in Fashion
Mark Seliger – 2009 Achievement in Portraiture
Reza – 2009 Achievement in Documentary
W. Eugene Smith Memorial Fund (established 1979) – 2009 Spotlight Award

2010
Tina Barney – 2010 Achievement in Portraiture
Howard Bingham – 2010 Achievement in Photojournalism
James Drake – 2010 Achievement in Sports
David Goldblatt – 2010 Lifetime Achievement
Graciela Iturbide – 2010 Achievement in Fine Art
Michael Nyman – 2010 The Double Exposure Award
Lee Tanner – 2010 Achievement in Documentary
The Eddie Adams Workshop – 2010 Visionary Award
Center for Photography at Woodstock – 2010 Spotlight Award

2011
Dawoud Bey – 2011 Achievement in Portraiture
Bill Eppridge – 2011 Achievement in Photojournalism
Rich Clarkson – 2011 Achievement in Sports
Nobuyoshi Araki – 2011 Achievement in Fine Art
Eli Reed – 2011 Achievement in Documentary
Nancy McGirr – 2011 Humanitarian Award
The International Center of Photography – 2011 Spotlight Award

2012
Greg Gorman – 2012 Achievement in Portraiture
David Burnett – 2012 Achievement in Photojournalism
John Biever – 2012 Achievement in Sports
Joel Meyerowitz – 2012 Lifetime Achievement
Tod Papageorge – 2012 Achievement in Documentary
Arthur Tress – 2012 Achievement in Fine Art
Jessica Lange – 2012 Double Exposure Award
Brigitte Lacombe – 2012 Achievement in Travel and Portraiture

2013
Li Zhensheng – 2013 Achievement in Documentary
Victor Skrebneski – 2013 Achievement in Fashion
John H. White – 2013 Achievement in Photojournalism
Lisa Kristine – 2013 Humanitarian Award
Benedikt Taschen – 2013 Visionary Award
Harper's Bazaar (for article of Hendrik Kerstens's fashion photographs) - 2013 Fashion Layout of the Year

2014
Carrie Mae Weems – 2014 Achievement in Fine Arts
Martin Parr – 2014 Achievement in Documentary
Jane Bown – 2014 Lifetime Achievement
Nick Ut – 2014 Achievement in Photojournalism
Nan Goldin – 2014 Achievement in Portraiture
Pedro Meyer – 2014 Visionary Award

2015
George Tice – 2015 Lifetime Achievement
Danny Lyon – 2015 Achievement in Documentary
Stephanie Sinclair – 2015 Humanitarian Award
Jerry Uelsmann – 2015 Achievement in Fine Arts
David Hume Kennerly – 2015 Achievement in Photojournalism
Roxanne Lowit – 2015 Achievement in Fashion
Henry Diltz – 2015 Achievement in Music
Barton Silverman – 2015 Achievement in Sports

2016
Anthony Hernandez – 2016 Achievement in Fine Arts
Tsuneko Sasamoto – 2016 Lifetime Achievement
Don McCullin – 2016 Achievement in Photojournalism
Rosalind Fox Solomon – 2016 Achievement in Portraiture
Graham Nash – 2016 Double Exposure Award
Nathan Lyons – 2016 Visionary Award
Simon Bruty – 2016 Achievement in Sports
Musée de l'Élysée – 2016 Spotlight Award

2017
Art Shay – Lifetime Achievement
Larry Fink – Achievement in Documentary
Josephine Herrick Project – Humanitarian Award
Abelardo Morell – Achievement in Fine Arts
Steve Schapiro – Achievement in Photojournalism
Dominique Issermann – Achievement in Fashion
Judith Joy Ross – Achievement in Portraiture

2018
Lee Friedlander – Lifetime Achievement
Jane Evelyn Atwood – Achievement in Documentary
Shahidul Alam – Humanitarian Award
Raghu Rai – Achievement in Photojournalism
Gian Paolo Barbieri – Achievement in Fashion
Joyce Tenneson – Achievement in Portraiture
Camera Club of the Philippines – Spotlight Award
Co Rentmeester Achievement in Sports
John Moore – Inaugural Impact Award
Mohammad Rakibul Hasan – Discovery of the Year

2019
Jay Maisel – Lifetime Achievement
Stephen Shore – Achievement in Fine Arts
Edward Burtynsky – Achievement in Documentary
Zanele Muholi – Humanitarian Award
Maggie Steber – Achievement in Photojournalism
Ellen von Unwerth – Achievement in Fashion
Annie Leibovitz – Achievement in Portraiture
Rencontres d'Arles – Spotlight Award
Al Bello – Achievement in Sports
Tyler Hicks – Impact Award

2020
2020 Lucie Awards postponed due to the COVID 19 situation.

2021
Peter Magubane – Lifetime Achievement
Paul Caponigro – Achievement in Fine Arts
David Hurn – Achievement in Documentary
Joel Sartore – Humanitarian Award
Jean-Pierre Laffont – Achievement in Photojournalism
Pamela Hanson – Achievement in Fashion
Lynn Goldsmith – Achievement in Portraiture
Steven Sasson – Spotlight Award
Bob Martin – Achievement in Sports

2022

Robert Adams – Lifetime Achievement
Sally Mann – Achievement in Fine Arts
Lynn Johnson – Achievement in Documentary
Ami Vitale – Humanitarian Award
Michelle V. Agins – Achievement in Photojournalism
Manuel Outumuro – Achievement in Fashion
Kwame Brathwaite – Achievement in Portraiture
Tony Duffy – Achievement in Sports
Koto Bolofo – Achievement in Advertising
Candida Höfer – Achievement in Architecture
 Baxter St at the Camera Club of New York – Spotlight/Visionary Award

References

External links 

Interview with Susan Baraz, head of jury of IPA and Co-Chair oh the Lucie Awards, Dodho Magazine

Awards established in 2003
Photography awards